Mount Dangar is prominent basalt peak at the eastern edge of the Goulburn River National Park,  north-west of Denman, New South Wales.

It has an elevation of  AHD, and was first sighted by the surveyor Henry Dangar in October 1824, following his discovery of the confluence of the Goulburn and Hunter Rivers. Dangar named the domed shaped mountain Mount Cupola.

In April 1825, botanist and explorer, Allan Cunningham, renamed the mountain Mount Dangar, when he ascended the mountain during his second northwest expedition to the Liverpool Plains.

Acacia dangarensis (Mount Dangar wattle) occurs within the Goulburn River National Park.  It is regarded as critically endangered under the Commonwealth EPBC Act which, which in this case applies as a nationally threatened species and ecological community. The CSIRO concludes that A. dangarensis may best be managed by recognising centurial rather than decadal change in habitat.

Further reading

References 

Mountains of New South Wales
Tourist attractions in New South Wales